Linda Lorelle is a journalist who anchored the evening news for nearly 17 years at Houston's NBC affiliate, KPRC-TV. She is CEO & Executive Producer of Linda Lorelle Media, a communications consulting and video production firm based in Houston.

She created and hosts the award-winning Our Voices Matter Podcast. She won an Emmy for Beyond Brown vs. Board: The Journey Continues, a documentary on how Houston desegregated its schools, and an Emmy for her first-person account of another local news anchor's cancer. She garnered two national Gracie Awards, given by the American Women in Radio and Television.

Professional background
Lorelle made her move to broadcast journalism in 1987 after a career as a professional dancer and actress. At that point, Linda had already attained a B.A. in Developmental Psychology and a B.A. in Italian Language from Stanford University when she decided to turn to a new career in journalism. 

She went back to school to attain an M.A. in Broadcast Journalism from the University of Missouri-Columbia. While in graduate school, she became weekend anchor at KOMU-TV, the NBC affiliate in Columbia, Missouri. After completing her Masters, she went on to reporting at  KMOV-TV, the CBS affiliate in St. Louis, Missouri.

In 1989, she signed on with KPRC-TV in Houston as a weekend anchor, but was soon promoted to anchoring the weekday 6 and 10 pm newscasts, a position she held for 14 years. In the last two and a half years of her employment at KPRC, Linda moved to anchoring the 5 and 6 pm newscasts as well as the mid-day and 4 pm newscasts. Throughout her years at KPRC, she anchored Dateline Houston, led the station's documentary projects, and hosted several special programs, including the Muscular Dystrophy Labor Day Telethon and the College Fund (UNCF) Telethon. While at KPRC, she won two Emmys for "Beyond Brown vs. Board: The Journey Continues", a documentary on how Houston desegregated its schools, and "Sydney’s Story", her first person account of another local news anchor's (Sydney Seaward of KNWS-TV battle with cancer.

Linda has reported on a variety of stories and events through the years as a reporter and anchor, including Hurricanes Katrina and Rita; President Bill Clinton's first inauguration; President George W. Bush's first inauguration; the shuttle flight of Dr. Mae Jemison, the first woman of color in space and her Stanford roommate; John Glenn's return to space; the shuttle Columbia tragedy; Super Bowl XXXVIII; numerous NBA and WNBA Finals; the World Series; the Houston Rockets in China, and President George H.W. Bush's 80th birthday, complete with a first person account of what it's like to sky dive with the Golden Knights of the U.S. Army.

Her Gracie Award-winning documentary on the former President George H.W. Bush now has two permanent homes: at the Bush Presidential Library in College Station and in the Peabody Collection of the Museum of Broadcast Communications in Chicago, Illinois.  The Brown vs. Board documentary also rests in the Museum.

Linda left KPRC-TV in 2006.  In 2009, she founded Linda Lorelle Media, a multimedia production and communications consulting firm.  She works across all industries, C-suites and issues as a documentary filmmaker, expert media trainer and executive coach, producer and community convener.  In 2018, she launched the popular podcast, Our Voices Matter, sharing intimate conversations that remind us of our common humanity.  Her work in that arena led companies to reach out to Linda as a facilitator of authentic conversations on race, social justice and workplace diversity.

Awards and acknowledgements
In addition to her two Emmys, Linda is also a two-time recipient of the  national Gracie Award from the American Women in Radio and Television, as well as numerous honors on the local, regional and national level:

 2021 Silver Telly Award and Bronze Quill Award, Video for Baker Hughes, “Energy Transition”

 2021 Silver Telly Award and Bronze Quill Award, Video for Memorial Park Conservancy, “Eastern Glades

 2021 Silver Telly Award, Our Voices Matter Podcast; Social Impact Category

 2021 Bronze Quill Award, Best of Division and Best of Show, Video for Memorial Park Conservancy, “Eastern Glades”
 2019 Bronze Quill Award, Best of Division and Award of Excellence, mini documentary, “Now That We Know, We Can Never Forget” about discovery of slave cemeteries on Shell property in Louisiana
 2019 Top 20 Impact Maker Award 
 2018 Shell Social Performance Award for mini documentary, “Now That We Know, We Can Never Forget” about discovery of slave cemeteries on Shell property in Louisiana
 2017 Telly Award for the documentary, “Harmony Public Schools:  Charting A Course Toward the Future”
 2016 Silver and Bronze Quill Awards, IABC Houston, for the documentary “After the Storm: Deepwater’s Journey,” commissioned by Shell Oil Company to commemorate the 10th anniversary of Hurricane Katrina
 2016 Named one of Houston’s 50 Most Influential Women
 2015 Team Spirit Award, Chuck Norris & Kickstart Kids
 2010 Woman of Distinction
 2009 Inducted into the Greater Houston Women’s Hall of Fame - Induction video by President George H. W. Bush

2007 Houston Treasure Award, for her tireless commitment and contributions to the Houston community
2006 Loving Hearts Caring Hands Award from  M.D. Anderson
 Cancer Center, for her commitment and contributions to M.D. Anderson
2006 Honoree at the Rose Gala, benefiting the Women’s Home, for being an outstanding community leader
2005 AWRT Gracie Award, for 41@80: An Incredible Journey, a portrait of former President George H.W. Bush on his 80th birthday
2005 Houston Press Club Award, 1st Place, for “Houston’s Chinese Connection”, a documentary on Yao Ming and the Houston Rockets in China
2005 Houston Press Club Award, 2nd Place, 41@80: An Incredible Journey
2004 Emmy Award, for “Beyond Brown vs. Board: The Journey Continues”
2004 AWRT Gracie Award, Individual Achievement – Best Reporter/Correspondent for a 3-part series, “Goodbye Felicia Moon”
2004 AWRT Star Award, Best Houston Television Personality
2004 Whitney M. Young Humanitarian Award, Houston Area Urban League
2003 Macy’s Heart and Soul Award, honoring excellence in the fight against breast cancer
2002 Chron’s & Colitis Gold Key Award, recognizing Linda as an Exceptional Woman in the Houston community
2000 Anson Jones, M.D. Award for “Sydney’s Story”, a first person account of Linda’s experience covering the breast cancer battle of Houston anchor Sydney Seaward.  The article appeared in Health and Fitness Magazine
2000 Texas Associated Press Award for “She Got Game”, a one-on-one interview with WNBA star Cynthia Cooper about the Houston Comets’ 3rd championship and the death of teammate Kim Perrot
1997 Houston Press Club Award, 1st Place News Series, for “Sydney’s Story”
Several awards for “Buddy Check 2: Beating the Breast Cancer Odds” series on breast cancer, including the 1995 Commendation Award from the American Women in Radio and Television, the Cancer League's Media Community Service Award and the Cancer Counseling Media Award of Excellence
1994 Makeda Award from the National Coalition of 100 Black Women, for outstanding contributions to the community
1993 Matrix Award from Women in Communications, for the series “Mae's Dream”, documenting the shuttle launch of the first black woman astronaut
1992 Sampson Award from Houston Tennis Association for outstanding contributions to youth
1992 Media Award from the Texas Association for Year-Round Education in recognition of positive reports on “The New System”, aired during the 1991-92 school year
1991 and 1990 School Bell Award from the Texas State Teachers Association, for outstanding news or feature series “They Should Know That” and “They Should Know That, Too”

Linda Lorelle Scholarship Fund
Linda's interest in education and children led her to found the Linda Lorelle Scholarship Fund, a non-profit 501(c)(3) charity that provides major college scholarships and support to Houston area students.  The LLSF targets students with average grades from challenging backgrounds. To date, the LLSF has awarded more than $4.5 million in scholarships to nearly 400 students.  Each year the LLSF also hosts thousands of Houston area students and parents for a free, citywide College Preparatory Conference.

Community involvement
Linda's community activities include current and past, board and advisory board memberships in: the Linda Lorelle Scholarship Fund; Convergence Center for Policy Resolution; the Texas Woman’s University Institute of Health Sciences-Houston Center, the Houston Police Foundation; San Jacinto Girl Scouts; the Women's Resource; Society of Professional Journalists; Sisters Network; the Houston Zoo; the Junior League; the Children's Assessment Center Foundation and Casa de Esperanza and I Have A Dream.  Linda also served as the Selection Committee Chair for the 2002 Leon Jaworski Award.

References

External links
 Happy Holidays 1990
 SWAT Shooter 1993
 Yao Mania 2005

Year of birth missing (living people)
Living people
Television anchors from Houston
Stanford University alumni
University of Missouri alumni